ITP Media Group is a global media company founded in 1987. Its headquarters are in Dubai, and has offices in Abu Dhabi (the capital of the UAE), Saudi Arabia, India, the United Kingdom, Germany and the USA.  

ITP has over 60 media brands that attract more than 50 million people per month across its consumer, business, and influencer divisions.

Divisions 
ITP Media Group operates across digital advertising, content creation, video, social, events talent management and publishing.

ITP Consumer 
The consumer division has a large number of consumer media brands, including Harper’s Bazaar Arabia, Conde Nast Traveller Middle East, Esquire Middle East, Cosmopolitan Middle East, GQ Middle East, Time Out Dubai, and Masala.

ITP Business 
The business division includes Arabian Business, Construction Week, Hotelier Middle East, Commercial Interior Design (CID), Aviation Business and Oil & Gas Middle East. It hosts a number of events, conferences and information services open to GCC businesses.

ITP Live 
ITP Live launched in 2017 as a full-service social media and influencer marketing agency. It has represented and worked with a multitude of local and international social media influencers such as Omar Borkan, Logan Paul, MoVlogs, Amanda Cerny, Olivia Culpo, Ahmed Al Nasheet, Layla Akil, Saygin Yalcin, and Shahad Al Khattab.

In May 2019, it partnered with OHM Live to raise funds for COVID-19 relief efforts. The 24-hour broadcast featured guest interviews and performances from Eva Longoria, Dua Lipa, Jason Derulo, CeeLo Green, Maluma and Deepak Chopra.

ITP Promedia

ITP India

Other Divisions 
ITP Create (content consultant and creation agency), ITP Ignite (social media management agency) and ITP Gaming (which hosts launch events and the DGC MEA games industry conference).

Events and Awards 
ITP Media Group has a range of yearly events, exhibitions and awards shows across its portfolio of brands.

The Arabian Business Awards regularly features winners such as the Ruler of Ras Al Khaimah, His Highness Sheikh Saud Bin Saqr Al Qasimi, Colm McLoughlin, and Mohamed Alabbar and other senior business people, diplomats, rulers, royalty and celebrities.

In 2019, the GQ Man of the Year Awards was held in Abu Dhabi’s Louvre museum and was attended by footballer Mo Salah, supermodel Alessandra Ambrosio, and actor Mena Massoud. Also in 2019, Harper’s Bazaar Arabia’s World of Fashion Capsule was hosted by Victoria Beckham.

ITP Media Group hosts various bespoke events, including the Block Party at The Galleria on Al Maryah Island Abu Dhabi, the Dubai International Boat Show, and Yas Mall Fashion Weekend.

Management 
ITP Media Group’s Chief Executive Officer is Ali Akawi.

There are currently more than 400 staff mostly located at ITP Media Group’s headquarters located in Dubai Media City, UAE.

List of brands and digital assets 

 Ahlan!
 Arab Woman Awards
 Arabian Business
 Artchitect and Interiors India
 Architectural Digest Middle East (Conde Nast)
 Aviation Business
 Boutique Hotelier
 Care Home Professional
 Caterer Middle East
 Catering Insight
 CEO Middle East
 Commercial Design
 Emirates Interior Design
 CommsMEA
 Conde Nast Traveller Middle East (Conde Nast)
 Construction Week
 Cosmopolitan Middle East (Hearst)
 Digital Broadcast Middle East
 Digital Studio
 Esquire Middle East (Hearst)
 Facilities Management Middle East
 Foodservice Equipment Journal
 GQ Middle East (Conde Nast)
 Grazia Middle East (Mondadori)
 Harper's Bazaar Arabia (Hearst)
 Healthcare Radius
 Hotelier India
 Hotelier Middle East
 ITP.net
 Logistics Middle East
 Manufacturing Today
 Masala!
 MEP Middle East
 Men's Health Middle East (Hearst)
 Oil & Gas Middle East
 PMB Middle East
 Professional Jeweller
 Refining & Petrochemicals Middle East
 Revolution (Revolution Media)
 The Rake (Revolution Media)
 Time Out GCC
 Utilities Middle East 
 Villa 88
 WatchPro
 Women's Health Middle East (Hearst)

References

External links

Mass media companies of the United Kingdom
Mass media companies established in 1987
Companies based in Dubai